Evan James (1869 – 18 August 1901) was a Welsh rugby half back who played club rugby for Swansea under the rugby union code, and professional rugby league for Broughton Rangers. While playing with Swansea, James was paired with his brother, David, and together they were nicknamed the 'Swansea gems' and the 'Curly haired marmosets'. The brothers were the centre of a controversial move to the league game in 1892 and switched codes twice in their careers. He had three younger brothers, Claude, Sam and Willie, the latter two playing at the same level as David and Evan towards the end of their careers.

Rugby career 

James was first capped for Wales on 1 February 1890 in a match against Scotland, which was more notable for being the début game for Swansea team-mate and Wales legend Billy Bancroft. His début, without his brother as support, was deemed a total failure. On 7 March 1891, against Ireland at Stradey Park, James turned out for Wales alongside his brother to keep together their Swansea partnership. James's fifth and final cap took a seven-year gap to obtain when he turned out against England in 1899.

In 1892, James and his brother supposedly turned out for professional rugby league team Broughton Rangers, after which the Rugby Football Union banned them both from rugby union. In 1896, an appeal from Swansea and Wales was successful and the brothers were reinstated. On 28 January, three weeks after their final cap, David and Evan actually joined Broughton Rangers, and severed their links with rugby union.

International matches played
Wales
 1899
 1890, 1892
 1891, 1892

Bibliography

References 

1869 births
1901 deaths
Broughton Rangers players
Rugby league players from Swansea
Rugby union players from Swansea
Rugby union halfbacks
Swansea RFC players
Wales international rugby union players
Welsh rugby league players